Radio Sloan is a musician from Olympia, Washington.

They are best known as a guitarist for The Need, the band she formed with Rachel Carns; their other bands include Ce Be Barns Band, The Circuit Side, Fact or Fiction, Grandpa's Ghost Stories; and Courtney Love's short-lived all-female backing band The Chelsea along with Lisa Leveridge, Emilie Autumn, Dvin Kirakosian, and Samantha Maloney.  
They appeared as a guest with Los Angeles band Scarling., with whom they played bass guitar. They are also a member of Electroclash punk artist Peaches' live band, The Herms with JD Samson and Samantha Maloney.

Radio and singer Kathleen Hanna lived in a women's house at one time called "the Curse".
Later, they played guitar on Le Tigre's 2004 album This Island.

Radio Sloan is interviewed and appears with The Cebe Barns Band in the 1997 movie She's Real, Worse Than Queer, a documentary by Lucy Thane about women involved in the Queercore scene.

Discography

Albums

Margie Ruskie Stops Time Miranda July with music by The Need on Kill Rock Stars (1996)
"Jacky O' Lantern" 7" single on Outpunk (1997)
The Need CD on Chainsaw Records (1997)
The Need 10" EP with Joe Preston and DJ Zeena on Up Records (1998)
KaraNEEDoke double 7" collaborations with Slim Moon, Nomy Lamm, Audrey Marrs, Tracy Sawyer (formerly of Heavens to Betsy) and Tamala Poljak (formerly of Longstocking) on Kill Rock Stars
The Transfused by Nomy Lamm with The Need CD on Yoyo Records (2000)
The Need Is Dead CD on Chainsaw Records (2000)
 This Island CD on Mr. Lady Records (2004)

Compilations

"Sam" on Destination 7" Ross Records (1996)
"Crown" on Yo Yo A Go Go - Another Live Record CD/LP Yoyo Records (1997)
"Talk Potty" on La Foresta Della Morte Soundtrack CD Toyo Records (1999)
"Girl Flavour Gum" on The New Women's Music Sampler CD Mr. Lady Records (1999)
"Vaselina", "Crown", "Majesty" on Homocore Minneapolis: Live & Loud CD Lefty Records (1999)
"American Woman" on Projector LP Yoyo Records (1999)
"Resurrection", "The Green Manalishi (With the Two Pronged Crown)" on The Structure of Scientific Misconceptions/The System of Scientific Misconstructions compilation CD Toyo Records (2001)

Filmography
Jump to filmography as: Soundtrack, Composer

Soundtrack
Itty Bitty Titty Committee (2007) (writer: "2 Story Girl")
Don't Need You (2005) (V) ("Love Thing")
... aka Don't Need You: The Herstory of Riot Grrrl (USA: DVD box title)

Composer
Itty Bitty Titty Committee (2007)
Starcrossed (2005)

References

External links

Radio Sloan.com
Radio Sloan factsheet @ killrockstars.com
The Need

American women guitarists
American rock guitarists
American feminists
Feminist musicians
Living people
Guitarists from Oregon
Third-wave feminism
Year of birth missing (living people)
Queercore musicians
Musicians from Olympia, Washington
Place of birth missing (living people)
Guitarists from Washington (state)
Scarling. members
21st-century American women
Women in punk